Wairua may refer to:

 Wairua River, Wairua River is a river of Northland, New Zealand
 Wairua Falls, on the river
 Wairua, a genus of spiders synonymized with Nomaua
 Wairua, the spirit in Māori language; see Māori people
"Wairua", a 2017 song by Maimoa

See also
 Radula marginata or Wairuakohu, a species of plant in genus Radula, a genus of liverworts